Tamar Szabó Gendler (born December 20, 1965) is an American philosopher. She is the Dean of the Faculty of Arts and Sciences at Yale as well as the Vincent J. Scully Professor of Philosophy and a Professor of Psychology and Cognitive Sciences at Yale University. Her academic research focuses on issues in philosophical psychology, epistemology, metaphysics, and areas related to philosophical methodology.

Biography

Education and employment 
Gendler was born in 1965 in Princeton, New Jersey to Mary and Everett Gendler, a Conservative rabbi. She grew up in Andover, Massachusetts, where she attended the Andover public schools and then Phillips Academy Andover.

As an undergraduate, she studied at Yale University, where she was a championship debater in the American Parliamentary Debate Association and a member of Manuscript Society. She graduated summa cum laude in 1987 with Distinction in Humanities and Math & Philosophy.

After graduating from college, she worked for several years as an assistant to Linda Darling-Hammond at the RAND Corporation's education policy division in Washington, DC.

In 1996, she earned her philosophy Ph.D. at Harvard University, with Robert Nozick, Derek Parfit and Hilary Putnam as her advisors.

Gendler taught philosophy at Yale University (1996–97), Syracuse University (1997–2003) and Cornell University (2003–06), before returning to Yale in 2006 as Professor of Philosophy and Chair of the Yale University Cognitive Science Program (2006–2010). On July 1, 2010, she became Chair of the Yale University Department of Philosophy, becoming the first woman to hold that position in the department's history and the first female graduate of Yale College to chair a Yale Department. She held the position until 2013, when she was appointed as Deputy Provost for Humanities and Initiatives.

Since July 2014, Gendler served as the inaugural Dean of the Faculty of Arts and Sciences at Yale.

Gendler is married to Zoltan Gendler Szabo, a philosopher and linguist who is also a professor at Yale University. They have two children.

Honors and professional accomplishments 

Gendler has held Fellowships from the Andrew W. Mellon Foundation Fellowship Program in the Humanities, the National Science Foundation, the American Council of Learned Societies/Ryskamp Fellowship Program, the Collegium Budapest Institute for Advanced Studies, and the Mellon New Directions Program. In 2012, she was appointed as the Vincent J. Scully Professor of Philosophy at Yale. In 2013, she was awarded the Yale College-Sidonie Miskimin Clauss '75 Prize for Excellence in Teaching in the Humanities.

She is the author of Thought Experiments: On the Powers and Limits of Imaginary Cases (Routledge, 2000) and Intuition, Imagination and Philosophical Methodology (Oxford, 2010), and editor or co-editor of The Elements of Philosophy (Oxford 2008), Perceptual Experience (Oxford, 2006), Conceivability and Possibility (Oxford 2002). She is also co-editor of the journal Oxford Studies in Epistemology and  The Oxford Handbook of Philosophical Methodology.

Her philosophical articles have appeared in journals such as the Journal of Philosophy, Mind, Philosophical Perspectives, Mind & Language, Midwest Studies in Philosophy, Philosophical Studies, and The Philosophical Quarterly. Her 2008 essay "Alief and Belief" was selected by the Philosopher's Annual as one of the 10 best articles published in philosophy in 2008.

She also lectures occasionally for non-professional audiences as a professor with One Day University and as a diavlogger on bloggingheads.tv where she runs The Mind Report with her colleagues Laurie R. Santos, Paul Bloom and Joshua Knobe. She also serves on the Board of Advisors of the Marc Sanders Foundation, which awards prizes for outstanding work in philosophy.

On September 3, 2013, Gendler delivered the Keynote address to Yale freshmen during the class of 2017 matriculation ceremony. Her topic was "Keeping inconsistency in your pockets."

She is best known for her work on thought experiments, imagination—particularly on the phenomenon of imaginative resistance—and for coining the term alief.

Bibliography 

 The Oxford Handbook of Philosophical Methodology. Co-edited by Tamar Szabo Gendler, Herman Cappelen, and John Hawthorne. NY/Oxford: Clarendon/Oxford University Press, 2016.
 Intuition, Imagination and Philosophical Methodology: Selected Papers. NY/Oxford: Clarendon/Oxford University Press, 2010.
 The Elements of Philosophy: Readings from Past and Present. Co-edited with Susanna Siegel and Steven M. Cahn, NY: Oxford, 2008.
 Perceptual Experience. Co-edited with an introduction by Tamar Szabó Gendler and John Hawthorne. NY/Oxford: Clarendon/Oxford University Press, 2006.
 Conceivability and Possibility. Co-edited with an introduction by Tamar Szabó Gendler and John Hawthorne. NY/Oxford: Clarendon/Oxford University Press, 2002.
 Thought Experiment: On the Powers and Limits of Imaginary Cases. NY: Routledge, 2000.

References

Sources 
 Tamar Szabó Gendler's website
 Yale Daily News, "Professor goes back to school" (2009)
 PhilPapers archive link to Gendler's professional papers
 Cornell Sun, "Cornell Loses Philosophy Profs" (2006)
 ''Yale Daily News', "Philosophy Takes Steps to Rebuild" (2006)

External links 
 Tamar Szabó Gendler's website
 Bloggingheads.tv: Paul Bloom & Tamar Szabó Gendler, Percontations: Beliefs, Aliefs, and Daydreams (May 31, 2009)
 Keynote address to Yale freshmen during the class of 2017 matriculation ceremony
 Faculty of Arts and Sciences - A Home for the Humanities

20th-century American philosophers
21st-century American philosophers
Analytic philosophers
American cognitive scientists
Cornell University faculty
Yale University faculty
Philosophy academics
Living people
1965 births
Jewish philosophers
American women philosophers
American philosophy academics
Jewish American academics
Epistemologists
Harvard Graduate School of Arts and Sciences alumni
Yale University alumni
Phillips Academy alumni
20th-century American women scientists
21st-century American women scientists
21st-century American Jews